Circuit Européen Pau-Arnos is a club track in Arnos about  to the west of the city Pau in southwestern France which is famous for its street circuit Circuit de Pau-Ville where the Pau Grand Prix is held.

The site hosts track days, test drives, minor competitions and a race driver school.

On 19 August 2021, it was announced that the circuit to host races for WTCR and Pure ETCR. The WTCR became the first FIA series to visit the circuit.

Lap records 

The unofficial lap record (1:10.87) was set by Giedo van der Garde with Dallara F305 in 2005 during Formula 3 testing prior to the Pau Grand Prix. The all-electric Electric Production Car Series held tests with its race-prepped Tesla Model S P85 at the track. The official race lap records at the Circuit Européen Pau-Arnos are listed as:

Gallery

References

External links 
 

World Touring Car Championship circuits
Motorsport venues in France
Sports venues in Pyrénées-Atlantiques